The Government of British Columbia is the body responsible for the administration of the Canadian province of British Columbia. A constitutional monarchy, the Crown is the corporation sole, assuming distinct roles: the executive, as the Crown-in-Council; the legislature, as the Crown-in-Parliament; and the courts, as the Crown-on-the-Bench. Three institutions—the Executive Council (Cabinet); the Legislative Assembly; and the judiciary, respectively—exercise the powers of the Crown.

The term Government of British Columbia can refer to either the collective set of all three institutions, or more specifically to the executive—ministers of the Crown (the Executive Council) of the day, and the non-political staff within each provincial department or agency, i.e. the civil services, whom the ministers direct—which corporately brands itself as the Government of British Columbia, or more formally,  Majesty's Government.

In both senses, the current construct was established when the province joined Confederation in 1871. British Columbia is a secondary jurisdiction of Canada, a constitutional monarchy with a parliamentary democracy in the Westminster tradition; a Premier—presently David Eby of the New Democratic Party—is the head of government and is invited by the Crown to form a government after securing the confidence of the Legislative Assembly, typically determined through the election of enough members of the Legislative Assembly (MLAs) of a single political party in a election to provide a majority of seats, forming a governing party or coalition.

The Crown 

, as monarch of Canada is also the King of British Columbia. As a Commonwealth realm, the Canadian monarch is shared with 14 other independent countries within the Commonwealth of Nations. Within Canada, the monarch exercises power individually on behalf of the federal government, and the 10 provinces.

Lieutenant Governor 

While the powers of the Crown are vested in the monarch, they are exercised by the lieutenant governor,  personal representative, typically on the binding advice of the premier and Executive Council.

Powers and function 
The lieutenant governor is appointed by the governor general, on the advice of the prime minister of Canada. Thus, it is typically the lieutenant governor whom the premier and ministers advise, exercising much of the royal prerogative and granting royal assent.

While the advice of the premier and Executive Council is typically binding on the lieutenant governor, there are occasions when the lieutenant governor has refused advice. This usually occurs if the premier does not clearly command the confidence of the elected Legislative Assembly.

Federally, a notable instance occurred in 1926, known as the King-Byng Affair, when Governor General Lord Byng of Vimy refused Prime Minister Mackenzie King's request to dissolve the federal Parliament to call for a general election. More recently, on a provincial level in 2017 following the provincial election, Premier Christy Clark met with Lieutenant Governor Judith Guichon and advised dissolution of the Legislature. Guichon declined Clark’s request. Clark then offered her resignation as Premier, and the leader of the Official Opposition, John Horgan, who was able to command the confidence of the elected Legislature, was invited to form the government.

Executive power 

The executive power is vested in the Crown and exercised "in-Council", meaning on the advice of the Executive Council; conventionally, this is the Cabinet, which is chaired by the premier and comprises ministers of the Crown. The term Government of British Columbia, or more formally,  Majesty's Government refers to the activities of the -in-Council. The day-to-day operation and activities of the Government of British Columbia are performed by the provincial departments and agencies, staffed by the non-partisan public service and directed by the elected government.

Premier 

The premier of British Columbia is the primary minister of the Crown. The premier acts as the head of government for the province, chairs and selects the membership of the Cabinet, and advises the Crown on the exercise of executive power and much of the royal prerogative. As premiers hold office by virtue of their ability to command the confidence of the elected Legislative Assembly, they typically sit as a MLA and lead the largest party or a coalition in the Assembly. Once sworn in, the prime minister holds office until either they resign or removed by the lieutenant governor after either a motion of no confidence or defeat in a general election.

David Eby has been premier since November 18, 2022, after winning the NDP leadership election. He succeeded John Horgan, who led the New Democratic Party to a majority government in the 2020 British Columbia general election.

Legislative power 

The Parliament of British Columbia consists of the unicameral Legislative Assembly of British Columbia, and the Crown in Parliament. As government power is vested in the Crown, the role of the lieutenant governor is to grant royal assent on behalf of the monarch to legislation passed by the Legislature. The Crown does not participate in the legislative process save for signifying approval to a bill passed by the Assembly.

Government 
The Legislature plays a role in the election of governments, as the premier and Cabinet hold office by virtue of commanding the body's confidence. Per the tenants of responsible government, Cabinet ministers are almost always elected MLAs, and account to the Legislative Assembly.

Opposition 
The second-largest party of parliamentary caucus is known as the Official Opposition, who typically appoint MLAs as critics to shadow ministers, and scrutinize the work of the government.

Judiciary

See also 

 Politics of British Columbia
 Politics of Canada and Government of Canada
 British Columbia New Democratic Party (the incumbent government)

References

https://www2.gov.bc.ca/External links 

 Organizational structure of the BC government; on gov.bc.ca
 Government 101: How Government Works; on gov.bc.ca

Government of British Columbia
1871 establishments in Canada